This table displays the top-rated primetime television series of the 1955–56 season as measured by Nielsen Media Research.

References

1955 in American television
1956 in American television
1955-related lists
1956-related lists
Lists of American television series